Paul Vandervoort (July 12, 1846 – July 29, 1902) was an American soldier of Belgian descent who served in the Union Army and as the 11th Commander-in-Chief of the Grand Army of the Republic, 1882-1883.

Early life and military career
Vandervoort was born July 12, 1846 in Clinton County, Ohio to William and Theresa (Harvey) Vandervoort.

During the Civil War, he lied about his age and enlisted June 10, 1862 as a private in Company G, 68th Illinois Volunteer Infantry (a 3-month regiment). Vandervoort was mustered out September 26, 1862 at Camp Butler near Springfield, Illinois.  On May 19, 1863 he enlisted as a private in Company M, 16th Illinois Volunteer Cavalry (again, lying about his age) and mustered out of the service August 1, 1865 as a sergeant.  While with the 16th Illinois Cavalry, Vandervoort was captured by Confederates near Jonesville, Virginia in December 1863 and held at Andersonville Prison in Georgia, and Belle Isle and Libby prisons in Richmond, Virginia.

Post-war service
Following the Civil War, Vandervoort became active in politics, first in Illinois and later in Omaha, Nebraska, where he also worked as chief clerk for the Railway Mail Service.  Like many other Union Army veterans, Vandervoort was a Republican; however, he later switched his political affiliation to the Populist Party.

Vandervoort became active in the Grand Army of the Republic in 1866 and helped reorganize the Department of Nebraska after the organizations' initial difficulties.  He was elected 11th Commander-in-Chief of the G.A.R. and served 1882-1883.  Of particular note is that Vandervoort was the first veteran who had been an enlisted man to rise to the highest position within the G.A.R..  At the 1883 National Encampment, the National Woman's Relief Corps was recognized as an official auxiliary organization of the G.A.R. and Vandervoort was made an honorary member.

When Vandervoort lost his position with the Railway Mail Service, he became an assistant manager for the Cuban Land and Steamship Company of New York.  Vandervoort helped transport many Union Army veterans who hoped to find new lives as citrus farmers in Cuba after the United States installed a government there in 1899.  Vandervoort became a land speculator and personally laid out a colony known as La Gloria, which became the largest American settlement in Cuba.

Vandervoort did not live to see La Gloria prosper; and it did not.  He died July 29, 1902 in Puerto Principe, Cuba, and is buried at Forest Lawn Memorial Park in Omaha.

See also

List of Grand Army of the Republic Commanders-in-Chief

References

 Grand Army of the Republic. Final Journal of the Grand Army of the Republic, 1866-1956 (Washington, DC: U.S. Govt. Print. Off.), 1957.

American people of Belgian descent
1846 births
1902 deaths
People of Illinois in the American Civil War
Grand Army of the Republic Commanders-in-Chief